Carter D. Hartwig (born February 27, 1956 in Culver City, California) is a former American football cornerback and safety in the National Football League.

Early years
Hartwig played high school football at Central High School in Fresno, California. He then played college football for the USC Trojans.

Professional career
Hartwig was an 8th round pick (214th overall) by the Houston Oilers in the 1979 NFL Draft. He played for the Oilers from 1979 to 1984.

References

1956 births
Living people
People from Culver City, California
American football cornerbacks
American football safeties
USC Trojans football players
Houston Oilers players
Players of American football from California
Sportspeople from Los Angeles County, California